The Al-Aimmah Bridge disaster occurred on August 31, 2005 when 953 people died following a panic, and subsequent crowd crush, on the Al-Aimmah Bridge, which crosses the Tigris river in the Iraqi capital of Baghdad.

Incident
At the time of the stampede, around one million pilgrims had gathered around or were marching toward Al Kadhimiya Mosque, which is the shrine of the Shi'ite Imam Musa al-Kazim. Tensions had been high within the crowd. Earlier in the day, seven people had been killed and dozens more wounded in a mortar attack upon the assembled crowd for which an Al-Qaeda-linked insurgent group claimed responsibility. Near the shrine, rumors of an imminent suicide bomb attack broke out, panicking many pilgrims. Interior Minister Bayan Baqir Solagh said that one person "pointed a finger at another person saying that he was carrying explosives...and that led to the panic". The man was presumed to be wearing a suicide explosive belt on the bridge.

The panicked crowd flocked to the bridge, which had been closed. Somehow, the gate at their end of the bridge opened, and  the pilgrims rushed through. Some people fell onto the concrete base and died instantly. The ensuing crush of people caused many to suffocate. The pressure of the crowd caused the bridge's iron railings to give way, dropping hundreds of people  into the Tigris river. There was nowhere on the bridge for the people to go, as the other end of the bridge remained closed, and was impossible to open anyway, as it opened inward.

Attempts to rescue people
People dived in from both ends of the bridge trying to help those drowning in the river. On the Sunni side, calls went out from the loudspeakers of local mosques to help those in trouble. A Sunni Arab teenager, Othman Ali Abdul-Hafez (‘Uthmān ‘Alī ‘Abdul-Ḥāfiẓ), succumbed to exhaustion as he rescued people in the water. Thus he had drowned, and was later praised as a "martyr" by Iraqi politicians.

Aftermath

A three-day mourning period was announced by Iraqi Prime Minister Ibrahim al-Jaafari. Iraqi President Jalal Talabani said the catastrophe "will leave a scar in our souls and will be remembered with those who died in the result of terror acts." Many of the dead were buried in the holy Shia Islamic town of Najaf.

There was some political fallout also from the event, with Mutalib Mohammad Ali, the Minister for Health, blaming the defence ministers for not doing enough to secure the area. However, the prime minister dismissed any calls for resignation for any ministry.

After the stampede, a few commentators in the Western media speculated that given the scale of the incident it might tip the country into a civil war by antagonizing the Shi'a community. However, there was no immediate surge in sectarian violence. Opposition groups blamed the government and security forces for failing to prevent the incident. However, these groups themselves often encourage high turn-outs at religious events to prove the relative strength of their sect. Another factor leading to a high turn-out at Shia religious events is the fact such events were banned under Saddam Hussein, and so many attend to express faith in a way they were banned from doing for decades.

World reaction

Governments and world leaders offered their condolences after the deadly stampede:
 Syrian Foreign ministry official quoted by state news agency Sana:
"The Syrian government and people express their sympathy to Iraqis and to the families of the victims, and they wait for the day when security, stability and progress reign in the country."
 Iran Foreign Ministry spokesman Hamid Reza Asefi:
"[Iran offers its] condolences and sympathy with the Iraqi people and government. Suspicious hands are involved in conspiracies to incite violence and bloodshed among the different Iraqi groups and tribes so that they disturb the security and calm of the Iraqi people"
 UK Foreign Secretary Jack Straw, speaking on behalf of the EU and the UK –  holder of the EU presidency:
"It is still not clear exactly what started the stampede which led to these hundreds of deaths and injuries. However, it is clear that the same crowd of Shia pilgrims, celebrating an important Shia religious festival, had earlier suffered a mortar attack... I condemn utterly this despicable act of terrorism against innocent civilians just as I condemn, too, those that continue to use violence and terror more widely in order to further their aims in Iraq. The depravity of these individuals who commit these acts of terrorism against their fellow Muslims sadly knows no bounds."
 United States Department of State spokesman Sean McCormack:
"The United States deeply regrets the tragic loss of life of worshipers in Kadhimiya, Baghdad today... Our sincere condolences and thoughts and prayers go out to the many Iraqi families who lost loved ones in this tragedy." The stampede received relatively little attention in the U.S. media because it occurred just two days after Hurricane Katrina struck the Gulf Coast, the aftermath of which continued to dominate headlines.
 Amr Mussa, Arab League Secretary General:
"[We need a] redoubling of Arab efforts to support the Iraqi people in their sad hour."
 Pakistan President Pervez Musharraf:
"It is with most profound sadness and grief that I had learnt about the death of hundreds of pilgrims in Baghdad."
 UN spokeswoman Marie Okabe:
"The secretary general has learned with great sadness of the human tragedy that took place today in Baghdad."

See also
 List of fatal crowd crushes
 Karbala stampede

References

External links 

 BBC News "Iraq stampede deaths near 1,000"
"Iraq head defiant after stampede"
 CNN: "Iraq mourns 965 stampede victims"
 Reuters: "Iraq mourns as stampede loss overshadows war"
 The Times (London): Panicked pilgrims were crushed or leapt for their lives into Tigris
 The Guardian (London): "A cry of suicide bomber, and 700 perish in Iraq stampede"
"They were crying to be rescued. But there was no way to help them. It was survival"
 Iraq Warlogs: Corresponding Iraq Warlogs event

2005 disasters in Iraq
2000s in Baghdad
Baghdad bridge stampede
Bridge disasters in Iraq
Human stampedes in 2005